Lal Kaji Gurung (also Lalkaji Gurung) is a Nepali politician and a member of the House of Representatives of the federal parliament of Nepal. He was elected under the proportional representation system from Nepali Congress filling the reserved seat for indigenous groups. In the shadow cabinet formed by Nepali Congress, he is a member of the Ministry of Federal Affairs and General Administration.

References

Living people
Place of birth missing (living people)
Nepali Congress politicians from Gandaki Province
21st-century Nepalese people
Nepal MPs 2017–2022
Gurung people
1949 births